The Masada cableway is an aerial tramway at the ancient fortress of Masada, Israel. Its bottom station is  257 m below and its summit station is 33 metres above sea level, thereby making it the lowest aerial tramway in the world.

The cableway was built in 1971 by the Karl Brändle company of Switzerland to carry people to the ruins at the top of the plateau. It had one aerial tramway support pillar and two cabins with a length of 900 metres and an elevation change of 290 metres. It was replaced in 1998 by an aerial tramway built by Von Roll without any support pillar, thus allowing the cabin's hanger to completely enclose the two track ropes and the haul rope.

The cars run every fifteen (15) minutes during operating hours.

External links 
 Report with pictures (French)

Aerial tramways in Israel
1998 establishments in Israel